Si-eon, also spelled Shi-eon, or Si-on, Shi-on, Shi-ohn, Si-un, Shi-un, Shi-uhn, is a South Korean unisex given name. The meaning differs based on the hanja used to write each syllable of the name. There are 54 hanja with the reading "shi" and 14 hanja with the reading "eon" on the South Korean government's official list of hanja which may be registered for use in given names.

People with this name include:

Lee Si-eon (born Lee Bo-yeon, 1982), South Korean actor

Fictional characters with this name include:

Lee Shi-eon, male character in 2019 South Korean television series Failing in Love

See also
List of Korean given names

References

Korean unisex given names